Bombay Monkey are a UK indie-pop electronic music group from Crowborough and Royal Tunbridge Wells in Kent, England, United Kingdom

History

The production partnership of Guy Martin and Andrew Phillips was first formed in 2003. The duo created music with Rosko John of Archive and original Scratch Perverts member First Rate, playing their first gigs at The Forum Tunbridge Wells

Bombay Monkey went on to release a series of three, mainly instrumental, electronic albums during the period 2004–2008, with various guest singers and musicians including scratch DJ and producer Mr Thing.

Dave Tonkinsmith (vocals) came on board in 2013 and as the band worked on a series of songs for the album release Dark Flow released on BBE Barely Breaking Even Records in 2014.  
CJ Thorpe (bass guitar) joined the band in 2016 after performing together at a David Bowie tribute concert.

They are recognizable on stage by their unique custom sun-goggles which, along with their distinctive logo, were created by Brighton-based artist Mark Culmer aka Medina.

Members
 Andrew Philips - vocals (2003–present)
 Guy Martin - midi/VJ (2003–present)
 Dave Tonkinsmith - vocals (2013–present)
 CJ Thorpe - bass guitar (2016–present)

Discography

Albums
 Vanish! - Released 2005
 Time Travellers - Released 2006
 130 Astronauts - Released 2008 
 Dark Flow 2014 - Released 2014 BBE Barely Breaking Even Records

Production
 Contact, Sound Sanctuary, EP 2005
 Dust, Sound Sanctuary, album, 2008
 Kodak Sun, Summit of the Big Low, EP. 2020
 Ghost Ship, CODE, album 2020
 Love And Death, H2SO4 album, 2021

References 

https://lo-tek.co.uk/artists/bombay-monkey/

External links
 Official Website

British indie pop groups